Johann Sebastian Bach composed the church cantata  (False world, I trust you not), in Leipzig for the 23rd Sunday after Trinity. He led the first performance of the solo cantata for soprano on 24 November 1726.

History and words 

Bach composed the cantata in 1726, in Leipzig, for a solo soprano singer, for the 23rd Sunday after Trinity, which fell on 24 November. Closing the liturgical cycle (Easter having fallen relatively late that year), the cantata had been preceded the previous Sunday by Ich armer Mensch, ich Sündenknecht (BWV 55). The solo cantata is the last in a series of solo cantatas which Bach had begun nearly four months prior, with Vergnügte Ruh, beliebte Seelenlust (BWV 170, first performed 28 July 1726).

The prescribed readings for the Sunday were from the Epistle to the Philippians, "our conversation is in heaven", and from the Gospel of Matthew, the question about paying taxes, answered by "Render unto Caesar...". The unknown poet takes from the gospel the idea that the world is false and that man should concentrate on God.

The anonymous librettist's contribution is in whole similar to that of Wohl dem, der sich auf seinen Gott (BWV 139), illustrating the idea of Christians being surrounded by enemies, often operating under false pretenses of friendliness, such as the Pharisees, who sought to trap Jesus with the question of taxes. This is contrasted to the faithfulness of God. The final chorale, which is the first verse of Adam Reusner's "" (1533), is used to portray this sentiment, God's faithfulness being invoked to ask for protection from evil.

Scoring and structure 

Bach structured the cantata in six movements and scored it for a soprano soloist, employing a four-part choir only for the final chorale, and an instrumental ensemble of two horns, three oboes, bassoon, two violins, viola, and basso continuo. The cantata begins with an orchestral sinfonia, after which two contrasting recitative-aria pairs follow: the first one describing the world's wickedness, the second God's fidelity. A varied instrumentation provides colourful contrast to the lone soloist and to the text's relative simplicity.

 Sinfonia
 Recitative: 
 Aria: 
 Recitative: 
 Aria: 
 Chorale:

Music 

The cantata is set for just one singer, but the instrumentation is rich. Similar to other cantatas of the later Leipzig period, Bach used an instrumental movement from an earlier period as a sinfonia, in this case the music best known as the opening of the first Brandenburg Concerto. This version of the concerto, dominated by horns and oboes, is similar to the sinfonia BWV 1046a (without a violino piccolo and assumed to be an early version of the Brandenburg Concerto).

In the first aria the soprano is accompanied by two violins, in the second aria of dance character, by three oboes.

The two horns of the sinfonia return in the closing chorale, horn 1 supporting the soprano, horn 2 playing a fifth part.

Recordings 

 J.S. Bach: Das Kantatenwerk – Sacred Cantatas Vol. 3, Gustav Leonhardt, Knabenchor Hannover, Leonhardt-Consort, boy soprano, Teldec 1976
 Die Bach Kantate Vol. 59, Helmuth Rilling, Gächinger Kantorei, Bach-Collegium Stuttgart, Arleen Augér, Hänssler 1983
 Bach: Kantaten BWV 52, BWV 84 & BWV 209, Raymond Leppard, English Chamber Orchestra, Elly Ameling, Philips 1981.
 Bach Cantatas Vol. 12, John Eliot Gardiner, Monteverdi Choir, English Baroque Soloists, Gillian Keith, Soli Deo Gloria 2000
 J.S. Bach: Complete Cantatas Vol. 18, Ton Koopman, Amsterdam Baroque Orchestra & Choir, Sibylla Rubens, Antoine Marchand 2003
 J.S. Bach: Cantatas Vol. 38 (Solo Cantatas), Masaaki Suzuki, Bach Collegium Japan, Carolyn Sampson, BIS 2006
 J.S. Bach: Geistliche Solokantaten für Sopran, Helmut Müller-Brühl, Bach Vokalensemble Köln, Kölner Kammerorchester, Siri Thornhill, Naxos 2007

Notes

References

Sources 

 
 Falsche Welt, dir trau ich nicht BWV 52; BC A 160 / Sacred cantata (23rd Sunday after Trinity) Bach Digital
 Cantata BWV 52 Falsche Welt, dir trau ich nicht: history, scoring, sources for text and music, translations to various languages, discography, discussion, Bach Cantatas Website
 BWV 52 – "Falsche Welt, dir trau ich nicht": English translation, discussion, Emmanuel Music
 BWV 52 Falsche Welt, dir trau ich nicht: English translation, University of Vermont
 BWV 52 Falsche Welt, dir trau ich nicht: text, scoring, University of Alberta
 Chapter 33 Bwv 52 – The Cantatas of Johann Sebastian Bach Julian Mincham, 2010
 BWV 52.6 bach-chorales.com

Church cantatas by Johann Sebastian Bach
1726 compositions